A blanket fort is a construction commonly made using blankets, bed sheets, pillows, and sofa cushions. It is also known as a couch fort, pillow fort, sheet fort or den.

Parenting books frequently suggest building blanket forts as an activity for parents to participate in with their children. A blanket fort is made by grabbing blankets around the house and setting them up in a room-like manner.

In popular culture
As a staple of early childhood entertainment, blanket forts are commonly referenced in children's books, such as Corduroy's Sleepover and If You Give a Pig a Party.

In the third season of the television series Community, the episodes "Digital Exploration of Interior Design" and "Pillows and Blankets" focus on the idea of building the biggest blanket fort.

World Record
According to Guinness World Records the largest blanket fort ever was 625.8 m2 and built by Shawn MacArthur, Victor Rundbaken, Heather Harteis, Sarah Kershner, Murderboat Productions, Rumpl, Kyle Bulloch, Alexa Soles and Rachael Klaus. Afterwards, they donated the blankets to homeless charities in the Portland, Oregon area on the 9 December 2018.

References

Children's games
Bedding
Blankets
Pillows